Oldham King Street is a tram stop on the Oldham and Rochdale Line (ORL) of Greater Manchester's light-rail Metrolink system and is located opposite Oldham Sixth Form College, at the junction of King Street and Union Street in Oldham, England. The stop opened on 27 January 2014. It is built on the site of the former King Street Baptist Church, which occupied the site from 1862 to 2005.  The site was acquired by Compulsory Purchase Order in 2005, and the Church was rebuilt nearby in Chaucer Street with the compensation it received.  A plaque, acknowledging this, on a stone pillar from the original church stands on the corner of the site.

Service pattern 

References

External links

Metrolink stop information
Oldham King Street area map

Tram stops in the Metropolitan Borough of Oldham
Tram stops on the East Didsbury to Rochdale line
Railway stations in Great Britain opened in 2014
2014 establishments in England